Samsul Arifin (born 3 January 1992) is an Indonesian professional footballer who plays as a full-back for Liga 1 club Bhayangkara.

Club career

PSS Sleman
After four years playing for middling Liga 1 club Persela Lamongan, Arifin signed for PSS Sleman to play in the 2020 Liga 1 season. This season was suspended on 27 March 2020 due to the COVID-19 pandemic. The season was abandoned and was declared void on 20 January 2021.

Persik Kediri
In 2021, Samsul signed a contract with Indonesian Liga 1 club Persik Kediri. He made his league debut on 10 March 2022 in a match against Persebaya Surabaya at the Kapten I Wayan Dipta Stadium, Gianyar.

Bhayangkara
On 29 January 2023, Samsul signed a contract with Liga 1 club Bhayangkara from Persik Kediri. Samsul made his league debut for the club in a 1–1 draw against Dewa United.

International career
Arifin called up to Indonesia under-21 team and played in 2012 Hassanal Bolkiah Trophy, but failed to win after losing 0-2 from Brunei under-21 team.

Honours

Club
PSS Sleman
Menpora Cup third place: 2021

International 
 Indonesia U-21
 Hassanal Bolkiah Trophy runner-up: 2012

References

External links
 Samsul Arifin at Soccerway
 Samsul Arifin at Liga Indonesia

1985 births
Living people
Indonesian footballers
Persipro Probolinggo players
PSIS Semarang players
Persegres Gresik players
Gresik United players
Persela Lamongan players
PSS Sleman players
Persik Kediri players
Indonesian Premier Division players
Liga 1 (Indonesia) players
Association football defenders
People from Pasuruan
Sportspeople from East Java
Indonesia youth international footballers
21st-century Indonesian people